The 1946 Raisin Bowl was a college football bowl game played between Drake Bulldogs and Fresno State Bulldogs at Ratcliffe Stadium in Fresno, California. The game marked the first bowl game for Drake and the third for Fresno State. It was sponsored by the Fresno Chambers of Commerce, in the first Raisin Bowl.

Game summary
The Drake took the early 6-0 first quarter lead on a Wallace Rooker 1-yard run, but missed the PAT. Fresno State would score a second-quarter touchdown courtesy of a Jack Kelly 19-yard run, tying the game 6-6. The ensuing PAT was blocked by Drake, leading to a 6-6 halftime score. The third quarter would see Fresno State take their only lead of the game on a Mel Gustafson 1-yard run. Fresno State again missed the PAT. The lead would last only a quarter as a fourth quarter Drake touchdown pass from Jack Coupe to Charles McDowell set up the game winning extra point by Jim Baer. Fresno State set a bowl record of nine turnovers. The Drake defense intercepted six passes and recovered three fumbles in the 13-12 victory the game ended with a very close score.

Aftermath
The victory would improve Drake's bowl record to 1-0. Fresno State fell to 2-1 in bowl games. Drake became the first Iowa team to participate in a college football bowl game.

Scoring summary

First Quarter

DrakeRooker 1-yard run (PAT failed)

Second Quarter

Fresno StateKelley 19 yard (PAT blocked)

Third Quarter

Fresno StateGustafson 1-yard run (PAT failed)

Fourth Quarter

DrakeCoupe 24-yard pass to McDowell (Baer Kick)

References

Raisin Bowl
Raisin Bowl
Drake Bulldogs football bowl games
Fresno State Bulldogs football bowl games
January 1946 sports events in the United States
Raisin Bowl